Prochoristis is a genus of moths of the family Crambidae.

Species
Prochoristis campylopa Meyrick, 1935
Prochoristis crudalis (Lederer, 1863)
Prochoristis malekalis Amsel, 1961
Prochoristis rupicapralis (Lederer, 1855)

References

Natural History Museum Lepidoptera genus database

Cybalomiinae
Crambidae genera
Taxa named by Edward Meyrick